Adelmund is a surname. Notable people with the surname include:

Karin Adelmund (1949–2005), Dutch politician and trade union leader
Kristian Adelmund (born 1987), Dutch footballer